Jaakko Mäntyjärvi (born 1963) is a Finnish composer of classical music, and a professional translator.

Early life
Mäntyjärvi was born in Turku. He studied musicology, English philology and linguistics at the University of Helsinki, graduating with an FK (master's) degree in 1991. In 1987, he was accredited as an Authorized Translator from Finnish to English and English to Finnish, and since then he has been employed as a professional translator. He has also studied theory of music and choir conducting at the Sibelius Academy.

Compositions
As a composer, Jaakko Mäntyjärvi describes himself as an eclectic traditionalist: eclectic in that he adopts influences from a number of styles and periods, fusing them into his own idiom; traditionalist in that his musical language is based on a traditional approach and uses the resources of modern music only sparingly. Because he is himself active in making music, his music is very practically oriented; he is a choral singer, and thus most of his works are for choir.

His major choral works include Four Shakespeare Songs (1984), Dagen svalnar... (Day is cooling; 1991/93), Ave Maria (1991), Pseudo-Yoik (1994), El Hambo (1997), and More Shakespeare Songs (1997); his work Canticum Calamitatis Maritimae received third prize in the European composition competition for cathedral choirs in 1997. His major commissions include a work for mixed choir for the contemporary choral music seminar at the Cork International Choral Festival in spring 1999, a choral work for the 700th anniversary of the consecration of Turku Cathedral in summer 2000, and commissions from Chanticleer (2001) and the King’s Singers (2002). He was composer-in-residence of the Tapiola Chamber Choir from 2000 to 2005.  In 2006 he was commissioned to write a new 40-part work for choir, Tentatio, for the Tallis Festival.

Mäntyjärvi has been active as an amateur and semi-professional musician, mainly as a choral singer with a number of Finnish choirs, including the Savonlinna Opera Festival Choir, the professional Sibelius Academy Vocal Ensemble and the Tapiola Chamber Choir. He conducted the Savolaisen Osakunnan Laulajat student choir from 1988 to 1993 and was deputy conductor of the Tapiola Chamber Choir from 1998 to 2004.

In 2011 Mäntyjärvi composed a choral work Cornish Lullaby for Helsinki Academic Male Choir KYL (Kauppakorkeakoulun Ylioppilaskunnan Laulajat), which was one of the pieces of the winning performance in the V Cornwall International Male Voice Choral Festival.

In 2012 he was commissioned by Exultate Singers based in Bristol, UK to write a setting of Iste Mundus, premiered at St George's Bristol on Saturday 23 February 2013.

Works

Mixed choir
 Kolme romanttista laulelmaa (1982)
 1. Häätanhu; 2. Tikanpolkka; 3. Nocturno
 Four Shakespeare Songs (1984)
 1. Come Away, Death; 2. Lullaby; 3. Double, Double Toil and Trouble; 4. Full Fathom Five
 Dagen svalnar... (1991/93)
 Ave Maria (1991)
 Pseudo-Yoik (1994)
 El Hambo (1997)
 Canticum Calamitatis Maritimae (1997)
 More Shakespeare Songs (1997)
 1. Fear No More; 2. Over Hill, Over Dale; 3. Time; 4. Who Is Silvia?; 5. A Scurvy Tune
 No more Shakespeare songs? (2000)
 Oi vauva, minulla on ne siniset (O infant, I am in possession of the ultramarines) (2000)
 SALVAT 1701 (2000)
 Deux ballades de François Villon (2001)
 Itkevä merimies (2003)
 Iste Mundus (2013)

Female choir
 Pseudo-Yoik Lite (1994/97)
 Maan päällä kuljen, etsin (1995)
 Tvenne ballader (1999)
 1. Konungen och trollkvinnan; 2. Herr Olof

Male choir
 Hodie Christus natus est (1991)
 Pseudo-Yoik NT (1994/97)
 Hiru gaukantu euskaldun eta tabernako abesti bat (1999)
 1. Ilargia, iturria; 2. Emakume bat ikusi dut; 3. Zure begiak maite ditut; 4. Ardotxo txuria
 Cornish Lullaby (2011)

Choir with instruments
 Kouta (1996)
 Stabat Mater (1998)
 Kyrie in memoriam (2001)

Orchestral
 CCCX/O (2002)
 Ah! mik’ ompi elom’ tääll’ (2002)

Chamber music
 Miniatures for Four (1984)
 Fac me vere tecum flere (2000)

Recordings
Jaakko Mäntyjärvi: Choral works Pseudo-Yoik & El Hambo, Shakespeare Songs ('Come away, death'; 'Lullaby'; 'Double, double, toil and trouble'; 'Full fathom five'; 'Fear no more'; 'Over hill, over dale'; 'Time'; 'Who is Sylvia'; 'A scurvy tune'), Psalm 150", Canticum Calamatatis Maritimae, Kouta, Sibelius Academy Chamber Orchestra, Tapiola Chamber Choir, Emmiliiana Tikkala (piccolo), Hannu Norjanen Finlandia 0927 41563
 All Shall Be Well O Magnum Mysterium'' Exultate Singers, David Ogden, Naxos 8.572760

References
Guardian notice about Mäntyjärvi being performed at the Huddersfield Contemporary Music Festival in 2003, accessed 8 February 2010
Music Pointers review of Jaakko Mäntyjärvi Choral works CD Finlandia 0927 41563, accessed 8 February 2010
Details of concert including world premiere of "Iste Mundus", accessed 21 February 2012

External links
Jaakko Mäntyjärvi's web site, accessed 18 June 2012
Jaako Mäntyjärvi's biography in English, accessed 11 May 2018 
Oclassical list of concerts in Britain that include works by Jaakko Mäntyjärvi, accessed 8 February 2010
Finnish Music Centre biographical page, accessed 8 February 2010
List of composer's recordings (36), accessed 8 February 2010

20th-century classical composers
21st-century classical composers
1963 births
Finnish classical composers
Living people
Finnish translators
Musicians from Turku
University of Helsinki alumni
Translators from Finnish
Translators to English
Translators from English
Translators to Finnish
20th-century translators
21st-century translators
Finnish male classical composers
20th-century male musicians
21st-century male musicians
20th-century Finnish composers
21st-century Finnish composers